The 1935–36 Campionat de Catalunya season was the 37th since its establishment and was played between 1 September and 3 November 1935.

Overview before the season
Six teams joined the Division One league, including two that would play the 1935–36 La Liga and four from the 1935–36 Segunda División.

From La Liga
Barcelona
Espanyol

From Segunda División

Badalona
Girona
Júpiter
Sabadell

Division One

League table

Results

Top goalscorers

Division Two

League table

Copa Catalunya seasons
1935–36 in Spanish football